Presidio Brass is a brass quintet based in San Diego, California.  Founded in 2006 primarily as a vehicle for promoting music education, the ensemble has become perhaps equally known for their work on the concert stage. The group's repertoire is made up of classical and commercial music transcriptions, including selections from composers Aaron Copland, Samuel Barber and George Gershwin to popular songs from jazz legend Dave Brubeck, the rock band Queen and the Broadway smash hit, West Side Story. The group often utilizes other instruments beyond brass, most notably piano, vocals/singing, and percussion.

The group has toured throughout the United States, China, and Canada.

Current members
Steve O'Connor- trumpet
Miles McAllister- trumpet
Josh Bledsoe- trombone/vocalist/guitar
Geoff Durbin- euphonium/trombone
Mike Frasier- tuba/piano

Discography
Sounds of the Cinema (Dunrobin Music, 2009)
Christmas Day (Dunrobin Music, 2007)
Stolen Moments (Dunrobin Music, 2007)

References

External links
Official Website

Brass quintets
American brass bands